Aunk (anciently Anke) is a small hamlet and former manor in the parish of Clyst Hydon in East Devon, England. The place-name is of Celtic origin along with other local place-names such as Hemyock and Whimple.

References

External links 
 

Villages in Devon